The ASCOD (Austrian Spanish Cooperation Development) armoured fighting vehicle family is the product of a cooperation agreement between Austrian Steyr-Daimler-Puch AG and Spanish General Dynamics Santa Bárbara Sistemas (both companies are now divisions of a unit of General Dynamics). The ASCOD family includes the LT 105, a light tank equipped with a 105 mm gun, a surface-to-air missile (SAM) launcher, an anti-tank missile launcher, mortar carrier, R&R vehicle, Command & Control vehicle, ambulance, artillery observer, and the AIFV model. In Spanish service, the vehicle is called "Pizarro", while the Austrian version is called "Ulan".

History 

The ASCOD was designed to replace the older light armoured fighting vehicles of the Austrian and Spanish armies, such as the M113 armored personnel carrier and the Saurer APC. The Ulan, the Austrian version of the Pizarro, would provide a flexible complement to their heavy Leopard 2A4. The Ulan would allow the Austrian army to deploy rapidly and effectively over longer distances, especially for foreseeable future operations—such as troubled spots for UN operations.

In 1982, Steyr-Daimler-Puch Spezialfahrzeug initiated the conception phase for the development of a new infantry fighting vehicle. This was followed by initial talks with the militaries of Greece, Norway and Switzerland to find the desired requirements for a new IFV. The decision to develop a new IFV was made following the Bundesheer announcement of the military requirement for the Kampfschützenpanzer 90 (combat infantry fighting vehicle 90) in 1985. Based on this, Steyr-Daimler-Puch Spezialfahrzeug started the conception of the vehicle; however, it was clear that Austria would not order new IFVs in the next years and that the development costs exceeded Steyr's budget. Therefore, in 1988, a cooperation with the Spanish company Empresa National Santa Barbara S. A. was signed, which resulted in the development being renamed to ASCOD (Austrian Spanish Cooperative Development). Following this, the development of the ASCOD was started. The hulls were manufactured in Spain, while the ASCOD turrets (based on the SP-30 turret design used on the scout version of the Pandur) were made by Steyr in Austria. The first prototype was presented in 1991 in Sevilla and tested by 1992 with production being possible only four years later.

Following the numerous changed requirements during the ASCOD's conception and development phase, the weight increased from the original 18.8 t to 25.2 t and finally 29.0 tonnes. The first prototype was trialed in Norway in 1993/94; however, Norway decided against buying the ASCOD and preferred the Swedish CV9030 instead. Following these trials, a slightly updated third prototype was built, which essentially equals the version finally offered as ASCOD to Austria, Spain and other countries.  In 1994, Spain decided to order four pre-series vehicles after successful trials of the prototype. In 1996, Spain ordered 144 vehicles with the designation "Pizarro". Due to financial reasons, Austria's order for the first 112 ASCOD vehicles did not happen until May 1999. The designation "Ulan" is used for the ASCOD in Austrian service. Four pre-series Ulan were given to the Austrian Bundesheer in April 2001 for the final qualification. The official handover happened in May 2001. In 2002, 28 Ulans were delivered, the next batch of 36 was delivered in 2003 and in 2004 the order was finished. In contrast to the original prototypes, the "Ulan" was completely manufactured in Austria.

The ASCOD was a very modern solution to bringing both Austrian and Spanish armour up to date. To put this into perspective, the Pizarro project was a part of the greater Project CORAZA (Project Armour), which was to replace Spain's M113 APCs, M60A3s, and M110 artillery pieces. By 2005, the Austrian army was equipped with 112 Ulan vehicles and Spain with 144 (123 IFV and 21 C2V).

In 2004, the Spanish Ministry of Defence ordered another 212 Pizarros (170 IFV, 5 C2V, 28 Artillery observation, 8 recovery, 1 Engineering vehicle) for €707.5 million Euros, with up to 356 units total planned. By 2010 the cost of this second batch had increased to €845m.

The improved ASCOD 2 vehicle was chosen by the UK MoD in March 2010 as the common base platform for the Scout Specialist Vehicle, which was later renamed Ajax. This selection was the result of the UK's Specialist Vehicle Programme. Around 300 British engineers at General Dynamics UK's Oakdale facility began developing the Ajax from the ASCOD 2 after being awarded the contract in 2010.
The ASCOD 2 Scout SV will serve as the replacement for CVR(T) family vehicles, including the FV107 Scimitar, the FV103 Spartan and the FV106 Samson armoured recovery vehicle.

General Dynamics offered the ASCOD 2 in an APC configuration to the competition for the Danish M113 replacement. The ASCOD 2 was not chosen, as the Danish army preferred a wheeled option with the Piranha 5.

Deployment history
ASCOD entered service with the Spanish and Austrian armies in 2002. The British Army is to receive its first ASCOD SV in 2020.
Despite being part of ISAF, Spain did not deploy the Pizarro IFV due to lacking a mine-protection kit.

Design 

The main version of the ASCOD is the tracked infantry fighting vehicle. It follows a conventional layout with a front-mounted engine and a rear compartment for the dismounts. The driver's seat is located at the left hull front, whereas the commander and gunner sit in the slightly off-center-mounted two-man turret. The rear compartment also has two hatches on the roof. The Ulan can carry eight dismounts, whereas the Pizarro only carries seven.

Armament 

The ASCOD mounts a 30 mm Mauser MK-30/2 autocannon in a fully traversable electro-mechanical turret. The dual belt-fed 30 mm cannon, electrical stabilized on two planes, is able to fire at a rate of up to 770 rounds per minute and accurately engage targets on the move. As secondary armament, the ASCOD carries a 7.62 mm machine gun; the Spanish Pizarro is fitted with an MG-3 machine gun, whereas the Ulan is fitted with an FN MAG. The Ulan carries 200 rounds of 30 mm and 600 rounds of 7.62 mm rounds in the turret, a further 205 rounds for the 30 mm gun and up to 1,290 for the 7.62 mm machine gun are stored inside the hull. The Pizarro only carries 300 rounds of main gun ammunition.
This armament is comparable to that of the M2 Bradley and the CV90, and performed well in a Norwegian vehicles trial, although it ultimately lost to the Swedish CV90.

Optics and fire control system 
The Ulan is fitted with a digital fire control system built by Kollsman, which uses some components of the Kürassier A2's fire control system. The gunner's sight is manufactured by Elbit and provides 8X magnification in the day channel. The integrated thermal imager has 2.8X and 8.4X magnification, which can be accessed by both the gunner and the commander. The commander has a fixed daysight with 8X magnification. The Pizarro uses the Mk-10 fire control system from Indra, which has a full solution digital ballistic computer, day channel, thermal channel and laser rangefinder. Future versions of the Mk-10 will be fitted with a new VC2 thermal imager.

Protection 

The ASCOD is constructed of several rolled steel armour plates. The armour provides protection against 14.5 mm armour-piercing ammunition fired from distances of 500 meters or more along the frontal 60° arc, with all around protection against 7.62 mm ammunition.

The Pizarro is additionally fitted with limited amounts of SABBLIR explosive reactive armour along the frontal arc and might be upgraded with more later. The SABBLIR reactive armour increases protection against shaped charge warheads as used on rocket-propelled grenades. The Ulan has been fitted with MEXAS composite armour, which increases ballistic protection against up to 30 mm APFSDS rounds fired from a 1,000 m range over the forward 30° arc, and all round protection against 14.5 mm armour piercing incendiary (API) rounds from a range of 500 m. The Ulan is also fitted with spall-liners in order to decrease casualties in case of armour penetration.

Mobility 

In terms of mobility, the Spanish Pizarro is fitted with a  MTU SV-183 TE22 engine, while the Austrian Ulan includes a  MTU 8V-199-TE20 engine. The smaller Spanish engine gives it a power-to-weight ratio of 21, and the larger engine one of 25, offering both vehicles excellent mobility. Both versions use a Renk HSWL 106C hydro-mechanical transmission, and suspension based on torsion bar and rotary dampers; designed and manufactured by "Piedrafita". The ASCOD uses Diehl type 129 tracks. The Pizarro can go a maximum speed of 70 km/h, and a maximum reverse speed of 35 km/h.
It is able to drive at 75% gradient and 40% side slope.

Characteristics

Spanish version

Structure

Sensors

Armament

Propulsion

Variants and derivatives

The ASCOD chassis has been used for a number of vehicles in Spanish service and numerous private ventures developed for the export market. Aside from the IFV version, the ASCOD has been offered as light tank and scout vehicle. The ASCOD Direct Fire light tank can mount a number of different commercial turrets with 105 or 120 mm tank guns. It is expected to weigh about 30 tonnes.

Steyr-Daimler-Puch Spezialfahrzeuge has developed an improved version called Ulan 2; this, however, was never ordered by the Austrian government.

An improved version of the ASCOD, called ASCOD 2, has been developed by General Dynamics and was presented in 2004. It has an increased gross vehicle weight of 38 tons, with a growth potential to 42 tons. The ASCOD 2 has been presented as an IFV (with the SP-30 turret of the original ASCOD), as APC with raised roof and armed with an M2 machine gun (in a BAE Lemur remote weapon station) and as specialized APC for urban combat (designated ASCOD PSO).

In June 2008, GDELS, in conjunction with KMW, announced Donar, a medium-weight 155 mm self-propelled artillery system based on the KMW Artillery Gun Module (AGM) autonomous artillery system integrated with the ASCOD 2 chassis. A prototype has begun mobility and firing trials in Germany.

In March 2010, the UK MoD announced that ASCOD 2 will be used as the base for the Scout Specialist Vehicle of the FRES program, which later was renamed to "Ajax".

During Eurosatory 2018, General Dynamics European Land Systems presented a new variant of the ASCOD 2. The ASCOD medium main battle tank (MMBT), with a gross vehicle weight of 42 tonnes, is fitted with the Italian Leonardo Defence Systems HITFACT 120mm turret. This is also armed with a 7.62mm coaxial machine gun, a 7.62mm pintle-mounted gun and a 12.7mm remote weapon station on the roof. The 120mm smoothbore gun is coupled to a computerised fire control system, with the commander and gunner having stabilised day/thermal sights incorporating a laser rangefinder.

ASCOD IFV
Driver training vehicle – ASCOD hull fitted with a fixed superstructure instead of turret.
ASCOD Scout/Recce – ASCOD fitted with extensive ISTAR equipment and a three-man crew.
LT-105 Light Tank (ASCOD Direct Fire) – A light tank, designed for the export market, with a 105 mm or 120 mm gun. There are multiple turret options available, made by a different manufacturers: Oto Melara, Cockerill, General Dynamics, and Denel Land Systems (formerly known as LIW).
ASCOD 2 APC – ASCOD 2 hull with a raised roof and a remote weapon station. Offered to Denmark as an M113 replacement.
ASCOD 2 PSO – ASCOD 2 APC with improved armor protection.
Donar – Medium-weight 155 mm self-propelled howitzer based on the KMW AGM

ASCOD 2 MMBT – The name suggest it is intended as a medium main battle tank armed with either a 120mm or 105mm HITFACT turret.

National variants

Ajax

The ASCOD vehicle was chosen by the UK MoD as the common base platform on which the Ajax would be developed. This selection was the result of the UK's Specialist Vehicle Programme. Around 300 British engineers at General Dynamics UK's Oakdale facility began developing the Scout from the ASCOD after being awarded the contract in 2010.

These vehicles are the replacements for the CVR(T) family vehicles: FV107 Scimitar (armoured reconnaissance), FV103 Spartan (specialist personnel carrier) and FV106 Samson (recovery vehicle).

Recce Block 2 is expected to include ambulance, engineer reconnaissance and command & control replacements for the CVR(T) FV104 Samaritan (armoured ambulance) and FV105 Sultan (command vehicle).

The Ajax is planned to include the following upgrades:
The main weapon will be a 40mm autocannon with "telescoped ammunition" (CT40 cannon).
The armour will provide basic ballistic and mine protection, with upgrade add-on packages for improved protection when needed.
The chassis will be upgraded with enhanced suspension combining torsion bars and hydraulic dampers.
Enhanced powertrain comprising 600 kW (805 bhp) MTU V8 199 diesel engine and Renk 256B fully automatic transmission.
The welded turret will be built by Lockheed Martin UK.
Assembly and testing will take place in the UK 

The vehicle's normal combat weight is 34 tonnes.

Pizarro

ASCOD Pizarro is built by Santa Bárbara Sistemas. It has multiple variants:
VCI/C – Infantry/Cavalry Vehicle; the basic ASCOD Pizarro.
VCPC – Command Vehicle
VCOAV – (Vehículo de Observación Avanzada) Advanced Reconnaissance Vehicle
VCREC – Recovery Vehicle
VCZ Castor – (Vehículo de Combate de Zapadores) Sappers Combat Vehicle
VCE – Combat Engineer Vehicle (under development as of December 2018)
This variant is operated by Spain.

Sabrah Light Tank

 
The Sabrah Light Tank's tracked version is a new variant developed and offered by Elbit Systems for the Philippine Army's Light Tank Acquisition Project. It uses the ASCOD 2 platform with a new turret armed with 105 mm gun developed by Elbit in partnership with Denel Land Systems. The Notice of Award (NOA) for the project was issued to Elbit Systems Land by the Department of National Defense in September 2020.

Ulan
ASCOD Ulan is built by Steyr-Daimler-Puch Spezialfahrzeuge. It includes a more powerful 530 kW engine, and a different fire control system built by Kollsman.

Operators

Current operators
  – 112 Ulan. Delivered between 2001 and 2005.
  – 261 Pizarro. A first batch of 144 Pizarro entered service until 2003. A follow-up order of 212 vehicles, which were delivered between 2011 and 2015, was reduced to 117 following budget cuts. The current fleet is comprised as follows: 204 VCI/C, 21 VCPC and 36 VCZ Castor.
  — 589 Ajax (Scout SV) ordered comprising: 245 Ajax, 93 Ares, 112 Athena, 50 Apollo, 38 Atlas and 51 Argus.
  – 1 demonstrator released as December, 2022, from 20 purchased.Elbit Systems won the Light Tank Acquisition Project of the Philippine Army. They are supplying Sabrah Light Tank platform in different configurations: 18 tracked light tanks, 1 command vehicle and 1 recovery vehicle.

Potential operators
  —  The Griffin II light tank was selected for the US Army's Mobile Protected Firepower program. The initial contract is for 96 vehicles with first delivery by the end of 2023. The first units are expected to be equipped with it by Q4FY25.  General Dynamics Land Systems is offering the Griffin III IFV variant in the Optionally Manned Fighting Vehicle program to replace the M2/M3 Bradley.

Failed bids
  — General Dynamics European Land Systems (GD-ELS) is offering the ASCOD to the Czech Army, which is currently selecting a replacement for the service's aging BMP-2s. GD-ELS announced on May 31 at International Defence and Security Technology Fair 2017 in Brno that it had formed partnerships with 5 Czech companies to underpin its bid. In December 2018, ASCOD was shortlisted together with the Puma, CV90 and Lynx. On 20 July 2022 the Government of the Czech Republic announced that Defence Minister Jana Černochová was authorised to begin negotiations with the Swedish Government for the procurement of CV90MkIV infantry fighting vehicles. The negotiations for the new infantry fighting vehicles will be coordinated with Slovakia who had also recently selected the CV90 MkIV.

See also 
 Ajax
 Griffin
 M2 Bradley
 CV-90
 WPB Anders
 Puma (IFV)
 Dardo IFV
 BVP M-80
 ELVO Kentaurus
 Tulpar (IFV)
 Bionix AFV
 K21
 Type 89 IFV
 BMP-3
 Lynx KF31/KF41
 Warrior tracked armoured vehicle
 M8 Armored Gun System
 T-15 Armata
 List of armoured fighting vehicles by country

References 
Candil, Antonio J. "Spain's Armor Force Modernizes" in Armor, March 1, 1998. Fort Knox, KY: US Army Armor Center. ISSN 0004-2420.
"Quo Vadis Armour?" in Military Technology, November 1, 2003.
Army Technology
Spain's Ministry of Defence
¿INFANTERÍA MECANIZADA?

External links
General Dynamics European Land Systems - ASCOD AFV
Technical data sheet and pictures Spanish Pizarro from ArmyRecognition.com
The Ulan (ASCOD) in the Austrian Armed Forces - technical data and pictures

Tracked reconnaissance vehicles
Tracked armoured fighting vehicles
Armoured fighting vehicles of Spain
Armoured fighting vehicles of Austria
Armoured fighting vehicles of the post–Cold War period
General Dynamics land vehicles
Military vehicles introduced in the 2000s